Moshe Hirsch (born 1930—May 2, 2010) was the leader of the anti-Zionist Neturei Karta group in Jerusalem. He advised Yasser Arafat on Jewish affairs and visited him in Ramallah. Following Hirsch's death, shiva visitors included senior Fatah members, including Adnan al-Husayni (who brought a personal letter of consolation from Mahmoud Abbas), Hatem Abdel Kader and Bilial A-Natsha. 
Hirsch was the son-in-law of the now deceased Neturei Karta founder Rabbi Aharon Katzenelbogen and his first wife, and was the leader of one of the movement's factions. He was originally from New York City, and later moved to Jerusalem.

Hirsch had one glass eye due to an injury sustained when someone threw acid in his face. According to his cousin, journalist Abraham Rabinovich, the incident had no link with Hirsch's political activities but was connected to a real estate dispute.

Family and personal life
He was the father of three children. One of them is Rabbi Meir Hirsch. Meir who is his oldest son had taken over a lot of his fathers duties when he was reportedly suffering from Alzheimer's disease.

References

External links
 Neturei Karta International

1923 births
2010 deaths
Haredi rabbis in Israel
American emigrants to Mandatory Palestine
American Haredi rabbis
People from Jerusalem
Acid attack victims
Anti-Zionist Haredi rabbis
Burials at the Jewish cemetery on the Mount of Olives
21st-century American Jews